The 1970 East Carolina Pirates football team was an American football team that represented East Carolina University as a member of the Southern Conference during the 1970 NCAA University Division football season. In their first season under head coach Mike McGee, the team compiled a 3–8 record. The team's game against the Marshall Thundering Herd preceded the crash of Southern Airways Flight 932, in which 37 members of the Thundering Herd football team were killed that night.

Schedule

References

East Carolina
East Carolina Pirates football seasons
East Carolina Pirates football